Kaev Hua III or Chey Chettha V (1674–1731), born Ang Em, was a Cambodian king in the early 18th century (r. 1700–1701, 1710–1722, 1729–1730).

Ang Em was a son of vice king Ang Nan. In 1700, a Vietnamese army under Nguyễn Hữu Cảnh invaded Cambodia, he was installed as the king by Vietnamese. In the next year, Chey Chettha IV surrendered, and was allowed to restore. Ang Em was deposed.

Chey Chettha IV abdicated in favour of Thommo Reachea III in 1702. Chey Chettha IV married a daughter to Ang Em; this was a political marriage. However, Thommo Reachea III drove out Ang Em with the help of Ayutthaya Kingdom. Ang Em fled to Saigon in 1705, and sought help from Vietnamese Nguyễn lord. He came back to Longvek with Vietnamese army. In 1710, Ang Em ascended the throne.

In 1714, Thommo Reachea III captured Longvek with the help of Ayutthaya Kingdom. Ang Em was in dangerous. A Vietnamese army under Trần Thượng Xuyên and Nguyễn Cửu Phú (阮久富) was sent to Cambodia to help Ang Em. Thommo Reachea III and Chey Chettha IV were defeated and fled to Ayutthaya Kingdom.

In 1722, Ang Em abdicated in favour of his son Satha II.
In 1729, he resumed the government and was crowned as supreme king xith the title of Chey Chettha V. He reigned for six months and then abdicated a second time in favour of his eldest son, Satha II (1730).

References

 Phoeun Mak. « L'introduction de la Chronique royale du Cambodge du lettré Nong ». Dans : Bulletin de l'École française d'Extrême-Orient. Tome 67, 1980. p. 135-145.
  Achille Dauphin-Meunier, Histoire du Cambodge, Que sais-je ? N° 916, P.U.F 1968.
 Anthony Stokvis, Manuel d'histoire, de généalogie et de chronologie de tous les États du globe, depuis les temps les plus reculés jusqu'à nos jours, préf. H. F. Wijnman, éditions Brill, Leyde 1888, réédition 1966, Tome 1 part1: Asie, chapitre XIV §.9 « Kambodge » Listes et  tableau généalogique n°34  p. 337-338. 
 Peter Truhart, Regents of Nations, K.G Saur Münich, 1984-1988 , Art. « Kampuchea », p. 1732.

1674 births
1731 deaths
18th-century Cambodian monarchs